The Seoul International Cartoon and Animation Festival (SICAF) is an annual showcase festival of animation, cartoon and related art genres held in Seoul, South Korea since 1995. It is sponsored by the Ministry of Culture, Sports and Tourism and the city of Seoul. The main mascots are "Bummy" (버미) the tiger (after the original Korean word "bum" (범), which means tiger) and "Tanko" (땡고추, very hot chili pepper).

The festival has exhibitions, showing of animation films, promotion booths and various special events. There are an official competition section and invited guest section. Awards are given to the categories of long animation, short animation, TV & commissioned works, and internet animation. Online popularity votes are held as well. Grand prix winning animations include Hungary's The District! (2005), Japan's Tokyo Marble Chocolate (2008), and the Irish-Belgian-French The Secret of Kells (2009).

Among notable SICAF events was a 2003 performance by Ferenc Cakó, a Hungarian sand animation artist, which has been widely distributed online.

See also
List of festivals in South Korea
List of festivals in Asia

References

SICAF at Doosan Encyclopedia

External links

2012 SICAF Coverage at AnimationInsider.net
2011 SICAF Coverage at AnimationInsider.net
2010 SICAF Post-Event Coverage at AnimationInsider.net
2010 SICAF Coverage at AnimationInsider.net
2009 SICAF Coverage at AnimationInsider.net
2008 SICAF Post-Event Coverage at AnimationInsider.net
2008 SICAF Coverage at AnimationInsider.net
2007 SICAF Coverage at AnimationInsider.net
Cakó's 2003 sand art performance

Film festivals in Seoul
Animation film festivals
Exhibitions in South Korea
Film festivals established in 1995
1995 establishments in South Korea
Annual events in South Korea
Festivals in Seoul